Scott Stevens (born 1964) is a former NHL defenceman.

Scott Stevens may also refer to:
Scott Stevens (footballer) (born 1982), Australian rules footballer
Scott Stevens (singer), American songwriter, producer, singer and instrumentalist

See also
Scott Stephens, American television producer